Richard Clarke (born 3 February 1962) is an Australian former rugby league footballer who played in the 1980s and 1990s.

He played for the St. George Dragons in 1985, and the Newcastle Knights in 1989. He played for France in 1993.

References

External links
http://www.rugbyleagueproject.org/players/Richard_Clarke/summary.html

1962 births
Living people
Australian rugby league players
France national rugby league team players
Newcastle Knights players
St. George Dragons players
Rugby league props